The Hostage is a 2006 Latvian-Estonian comedy film directed by Laila Pakalniņa.

Cast
 Branko Završan - Hijacker
 Kristaps Mednis - Tom
 Ieva Puķe - Mother
 Pauls Butkevics - Antons
 Ivars Brakovskis - Visvaldis
 Valdis Liepiņš - Detective
 Kaljo Kiisk - Old man
 Jaan Rekkor - Coach
 Jēkabs Nākums - Self
 Maija Apine
 Rūdolfs Plēpis
 Imants Strads

Release
The Hostage was screened at the  2006 Warsaw International Film Festival in Poland.

Awards
The film received the following awards:
 2007: Kinoshock - Open Film Festival for states of the CIS and Estonia, Latvia and Lithuania (Anapa, Russia), best operator work: Arko Okk 
 2007: The National Film Festival Lielais Kristaps (Latvia), best artist's work: Jurģis Krāsons; several nominations in other categories

References

External links
 
 Koer, lennuk ja laulupidu, entry in Estonian Film Database (EFIS)

2006 films
Estonian comedy films
Latvian comedy films